The 1986 Firecracker 400 was a NASCAR Winston Cup Series race that took place on 4 July 1986, at Daytona International Speedway in Daytona Beach, Florida.

Race report
The field restarted with three laps to go, with Tim Richmond leading ahead of Sterling Marlin and Darrell Waltrip. Marlin, having competed in NASCAR since the mid-'70s, had never finished on the lead lap in his career. His chances for victory were compounded by the lapped cars of Bobby Allison, Cale Yarborough, and Bill Elliott who sat between him and Richmond. Caught behind the traffic, Marlin never had a chance to challenge as Richmond pulled away. It took three hours and one minute for Tim Richmond to defeat Sterling Marlin by 1.35 seconds after 160 laps. Putting aside his win in the 1982 consolation race, this was Tim Richmond's only win at Daytona in his career. Starting with his win at Pocono two races before this, he went on a tear for the rest of the 1986 NASCAR Winston Cup Series season, culminating in the best season of his career.

With seven laps to go, Dale Earnhardt, running a lap down ahead of the leaders, blew his engine heading into turn 1. As oil coated his back tires, Earnhardt lost control and spun head-on into the wall. Race leader Buddy Baker went low to avoid the accident, striking the side of Connie Saylor's lapped Ford. As Baker struggled to keep control of his Oldsmobile, Richmond shot past into the race lead and led the field back to the yellow flag. Baker managed to limp around, but the fastest car that day was out of contention.

Rain would bring out the day's sixth caution on lap 86, resulting in a nearly 30-lap caution period to dry the track. There were eight cautions for 51 laps; making the average speed of the race . There was an attendance of 78000. A. J. Foyt's had the last-place finish due to an engine problem on lap 2. Other notable drivers at the race included: Sterling Marlin, Darrell Waltrip, Kyle Petty, Ricky Rudd, Rusty Wallace, and Bill Elliott. All of the 42 drivers on the grid were born in the United States of America.

Richard Petty made his 1000th start in this race; making him one of the most durable figures in NASCAR history. Sterling Marlin got his first top-five finish here and in several other races before going on to win the 1994 Daytona 500. Yarborough made one of his final starts from the pole position in his NASCAR career in this race. Jody Ridley retired from NASCAR after this race. 

Notable crew chiefs for the race included Junie Donlavey, Robin Pemberton, Jeff McDuffie, Joey Arrington, Dale Inman, Travis Carter, Waddell Wilson, Larry McReynolds among others.

Qualifying
Drivers who failed qualify for this race were Phil Barkdoll, Blackie Wangerin, Ronnie Thomas, James Hylton, Harold Marks, J.D. McDuffie and Brad Teague.

Finishing order
Section reference:

 Tim Richmond
 Sterling Marlin
 Bobby Hillin Jr.
 Darrell Waltrip
 Kyle Petty
 Ricky Rudd
 Joe Ruttman
 Rusty Wallace
 Phil Parsons
 Alan Kulwicki
 Neil Bonnett
 Ken Schrader
 Jody Ridley
 Buddy Baker
 Bobby Allison
 Bill Elliott
 Cale Yarborough
 Michael Waltrip
 Terry Labonte
 Dave Marcis
 Rick Wilson
 Richard Petty
 Jim Sauter
 Jimmy Means
 Buddy Arrington
 Grant Adcox
 Dale Earnhardt
 Pancho Carter
 Geoffrey Bodine
 Connie Saylor
 Harry Gant
 Rodney Combs
 Doug Heveron
 Ken Ragan
 Eddie Bierschwale
 Benny Parsons
 Morgan Shepherd
 Tommy Ellis
 Greg Sacks
 Chet Fillip
 Ron Bouchard
 A. J. Foyt

Timeline
Section reference:
 Start: Buddy Baker was leading the starting grid as the race entered its first official lap.
 Lap 2: A. J. Foyt's engine was giving him troubles, forcing him to exit the race.
 Lap 13: Ron Bouchard had a terminal crash.
 Lap 14: Ched Filip had a terminal crash.
 Lap 33: Greg Sacks had a terminal crash, Tommy Ellis' engine stopped working properly.
 Lap 50: Morgan Shepherd just could not handle his vehicle properly anymore.
 Lap 78: Benny Parsons fell out with engine failure.
 Lap 83: Eddie Bierschwale fell out with engine failure.
 Lap 92: Ken Ragan's transmission started to act in a strange manner.
 Lap 106: The clutch on Doug Heveron's vehicle no longer worked properly.
 Lap 130: The brakes on Rodney Combs' vehicle were no longer satisfactory.
 Lap 143: Harry Gant fell out with engine failure.
 Lap 145: Connie Saylor had a terminal crash.
 Lap 147: Geoffrey Bodine fell out with engine failure.
 Lap 151: Dale Earnhardt had a terminal crash.
 Finish: Tim Richmond was officially declared the winner of the event.

Standings after the race

References

Firecracker 400
Firecracker 400
NASCAR races at Daytona International Speedway